Windsor Tower or Windsor Building may refer to:

Windsor Tower (Madrid)
Windsor Tower (Detroit)